Charles Gibbons Flanagan (July 4, 1872 – September 24, 1937) was an American football player and coach.  Flanagan served as the head football coach at Morningside College in Sioux City, Iowa in 1902.  He was later a missionary and known as "bishop of the Olympics".

Head coaching record

References

1872 births
1937 deaths
19th-century players of American football
American football guards
American football tackles
Chicago Maroons football players
Minnesota Golden Gophers football players
Morningside Mustangs football coaches
People from Yankton, South Dakota